Schloss Kirchheimbolanden is located in the town of Kirchheimbolanden in the German state of Rhineland-Palatinate. As a castle the site was first mentioned in a document as early as 1390.

History 
From 1602 to 1618, a castle (the so-called "old castle" or Alte Schloss) was built outside the actual town walls by the counts of Nassau-Weilburg, who had their permanent residence at Schloss Weilburg in Weilburg on the Lahn.

A new building was erected between 1738 and 1740 under Prince Charles Augustus of Nassau-Weilburg. Charles Augustus was an imperial prince and wanted a modern building. Guillaume d'Hauberat was engaged as architect and master builder; he also built Mannheim and Schwetzingen Palaces for the Elector of the Palatinate. A schlossgarten was to be laid out in a terraced design at the new schloss, the irrigation of which was to be taken from the copper pits of the nearby village of Haide. Some of these water channels have survived to this day.

After the occupation of nearby Mainz by the French, Prince Frederick William of Nassau-Weilburg fled in 1793 from Kirchheimbolanden to Bayreuth. This ended the castle's function as a princely residence, and thus also the reign of the princes of Nassau-Weilburg over this region.

In 1807, the castle and gardens were declared as French national property and could thus be sold. The site was auctioned in Mainz in 1807, as Mainz was now the administrative seat of the Department of Mont-Tonnerre. It was purchased by landowner and textile manufacturer, Daniel Andreas, from Mülheim an der Ruhr. He had the central structure and the left wing of the palace demolished and moved his private apartment into the remaining right wing of the palace.

After the end of French rule, Mont-Tonnerre fell to the Kingdom of Bavaria in 1816. The region was initially referred to as the Circle of the Rhine (Rheinkreis) and, later, as Rhenish Palatinate (Rheinpfalz).

On 21 March 1839, Schloss Kirchheimbolanden was sold to Bavarian master builder, Leo von Klenze from Munich. He had extensive structural changes made, but did not take up permanent residence at the castle. In 1841, he sold the property to pensioner, Heinrich Seligmann from Mainz, who, in 1844, sold it to farmer, Friedrich Brunck, from nearby Winterborn/Alsenz.

In 1848/49, the Palatinate Freischärler declared the castle to be their headquarters, but they were soon driven out by Prussian troops.

On 3 November 1861, the east wing of the castle burnt down. Friedrich Brunck had it rebuilt in a simplified form with two floors and a hipped roof.

In 2003, the old U-shape of the castle was rebuilt as Schloss Kirchheimbolanden Old People's Home (Seniorenresidenz Schloss Kirchheimbolanden), only the east wing being structurally reminiscent of its former form and splendour. But in this way the general shape of the old castle has been recreated as a three-winged complex.

Frankfurt garden designer, Heinrich Siesmayer, was commissioned by Dr. Heinrich Ritter von Brunck to design the palace garden. Siesmayer had been commissioned by the grandson (Duke Adolph of Nassau) of the last prince residing in Kirchheimbolanden, who then fled, with the sale of his extensive collection of plants and trees from Schloss Biebrich near Wiesbaden, because the Prussians annexed his Duchy of Nassau in 1866.

Literature 
 Heinel, Jürgen: Die Seniorenresidenz Schloß Kirchheimbolanden und ihre fürstliche Herkunft. Otterbach, 1995
 Lehna, Britta: Ein Käufer für das Kirchheimbolander Schloß: Marschall Kellermanns Petition an Kaiser Napoleon I. In: Donnersberg-Jahrbuch. 15th Issue, 1992, pp. 68–70
 Mayer, Peter: Die Pfalz. 8. Auflage, DuMont Reiseverlag, Cologne, 1992

External links 

Kirchheimbolanden
Kirchheimbolanden
Baroque architecture in Rhineland-Palatinate
Heritage sites in Rhineland-Palatinate
Hessian nobility
Donnersbergkreis
1730s architecture